Fort Dick or Fort Dix may refer to:

 Fort Dick, California is a small unincorporated city in Del Norte County, California.
 Fort Dix (NJ) is a large United States Army installation located in the state of New Jersey.
 Fort Dickinson (PA) was active from 1769 to 1784 during three Connecticut Yankee-Pennamite Wars.